Seoul Land is an amusement park opened in 1987, in Gwacheon, a city in Gyeonggi-do province, South Korea. It is located in the Seoul Grand Park complex. It opened just before the 1988 Summer Olympics. It has about 40 rides, including roller coasters and movie theaters. Seasonal festivals are held in the park. It is smaller than Everland, but closer to Seoul, about one hour away from downtown. Approximately 3–3.5 million people visit the park each a year. Roughly a third of its 300,000 m2 is green space, the rest being packed with attractions.

General Information
Seoul Land, Seoul Grand Park, and the main branch of the National Museum of Modern and Contemporary Art are all located in the Seoul Grand Park complex. Visitors may buy general admission tickets or one-day unlimited passes. General admission allows free entry to most rides. The unlimited passes allow almost all rides to be taken for free, but exhibitions, performances, and certain other attractions have additional charges despite the unlimited pass. Children aged 2 and under are allowed in for free. Prices for other ages are as follows:

Attractions
Seoul Land has five themed areas containing rides, arcades, obstacle courses, and other attractions. Many of the rides are themed with popular animation characters, such as Larva.

World Plaza
 Kids Land (for children)
 Game World coin-operated video game arcade

Adventure Land
 Shooting Range
 Ninano Go Kart
 Remote Control Boats
 Sky Adventure (Beginner)
 Sky Adventure (Challenger)
 Flume Ride
 Den of Lost Thieves
 Tikitoc Train A small, steel roller coaster for children. It runs about 16 km/h (10 mph).
 Sudden Attack This is a real-life simulation of the "Warehouse" map from the FPS game Sudden Attack, which is popular in Korea.
 King Viking A swinging gondola-type ride. This type of ride is well known in South Korea, and Lotte World and Everland have similar rides.

Fantasy Land
 IQ Arcade coin-operated video game arcade
 Midway Games coin-operated video game arcade
 Turning Mecard Go! Bumper Car (for children)
 Peter Pan
 Kambu Airplane
 Dragon Tank
 Arpo Swing
 Larva Twister
 Canimal Circus It is a 360-degree revolution rides, and it turns around back and forth. (over 130cm)
 Water Walk
 Action Zone
 Character 3D Theater
 Convoy Race (for children)
 Musical Carousel
 Turning Mecard Racing
 World Cup Ten soccer ball-shaped dishes round and round in the sky. (over 130cm)
 Kartrider Bumper
 Big Merry-Go-Round
 Cloud Bread (for children)
 Vroomiz Hill (for children)
 Tobot Train (for children) The Saseum Sseolmae ("Reindeer Sleigh") is a powered, steel roller coaster made by Zamperla and designed for children. One ride is 56 seconds long. It opened in 1990 and still operates.

Tomorrow Land
 X Flyer
 Zeppelin
 Rock Cafe
 Crazy House
 Motion Theater
 Super Wings
 Tilt House
 Time Machine 5D 360
 Frog Hopper (for children) A miniature Double Shot-style tower-based ride for children.
 Mini Viking (for children) A pirate-ship-style ride for children.
 Crazy Mouse Wild Mouse roller coaster. Steel coaster made by Senyo Kogyo The top speed is 28 mph and one ride is 1 minute and 22 seconds.
 Sky X One of the most popular rides at Seoul Land, Sky X requires reservations and has additional charges. On the ride, groups of two or three people are raised 50 meters off the ground by cable and then dropped.
 Shot Drop A tower-based ride similar to the Double Shot
 Black Hole 2000 Steel coaster made by Senyo Kogyo with two corkscrews, seven drops, and top speed of 100 km/h (62 mph). One ride is 2 minutes and 45 seconds long, 15 seconds shorter than the T Express at Everland. It opened in 1990 and still operates.
 Galaxy Train Also known as the (Columbia) Double Loop Coaster, the "Galaxy Train" is a steel coaster made by Senyo Kogyo. It has two loops, and one ride lasts 2 minutes and 15 seconds. The top speed is 52 mph. It opened in 1988 and still operates.

Samchulli ("Thousand-Mile") Hill
 Outdoor Pool
 Larva Sledding Hill
 Hutos Media Town (for children)
 Archery Range
 Haunted House
 Top Spin Called "Dokkaebi Wind" in Korean, this is a standard Top Spin, comparable to the Double Rock Spin at Everland. The highlight of this attraction is rotating air in six consecutive times. You can feel the thrill while driving 6 times continuously in the air. (over 140cm)
Seoul Land hosts a variety of temporary exhibits. These have included:
 Early 2008: a Creation Science exhibit, organized by the Korea Association for Creation Research (KACR), which was visited by over 116,000 visitors during its three-month run

See also
 Everland
 Lotte World
 Children's Grand Park
 http://www.seoulland.co.kr/webzine/2018spring/

References

External links

 Roller coasters detail at rcdb.com
 Seoul land official homepage

Buildings and structures in Gwacheon
Tourist attractions in Gyeonggi Province
Amusement parks in South Korea
1987 establishments in South Korea
Amusement parks opened in 1987
20th-century architecture in South Korea